Microgadus, the tomcods, is a genus of cods.

Species
There are currently two recognized species in this genus:
 Microgadus proximus (Girard, 1854) (Pacific tomcod)
 Microgadus tomcod (Walbaum, 1792) (Atlantic tomcod)

References

 
Gadidae
Marine fish genera
Taxa named by Theodore Gill